The Cypriot Women's Super Cup is the women's football super cup competition in Cyprus. It is played between the winner of the Cypriot Women's Cup and the Cypriot First Division champion.

List of finals
The list of finals:

No super cup was played in 2012 and 2016. Apollon Ladies won the double, but the cup runners-up didn't play.

Performance by club

References

External links
 Official Site

Women's football competitions in Cyprus
National women's association football supercups
Women
2007 establishments in Cyprus
Recurring sporting events established in 2007